Enlargement may refer to:

the growth in membership of political entities:
 Enlargement of the European Union is the political process for integrating countries into the European Union.
 Enlargement of the African Union
 Enlargement of the Arab League
 Enlargement of the United Nations
 Enlargement of NATO
 Enlargement of Switzerland
 Enlargement of the European Space Agency
in other contexts:
 In mathematics, an enlargement is a uniform scaling, an example of a Homothetic transformation that increases distances, areas and volumes.
 Enlargement (in fiction) is a theme in fiction, especially in science fiction and fantasy.
 An enlargement is a photographic print that is larger than the negative it is printed from, through the use of an enlarger.
 Penis enlargement.

See also
Expansion (disambiguation)